Pamela Irene Erickson (born 12 April 1951) is a medical anthropologist.  The holder of both a Dr.P.H (Public Health, UCLA 1988) and a PhD (Anthropology, SUNY Buffalo 1993), she is Professor of Anthropology and Community Medicine at the University of Connecticut, Storrs.  A former editor of the scholarly journal Medical Anthropology Quarterly, much of her own research has focused on reproductive health among Hispanic girls and young women.  Prominent among the publications resulting from these investigations is her 1998 book, Latina Adolescent Childbearing in East Los Angeles. Erickson has also done fieldwork in Nepal, the Philippines, India, and Ecuador and this work is reflected in her 2008 textbook, Ethnomedicine.  A Fellow of the American Anthropological Association and the Society for Applied Anthropology, Erickson has also served on the Governing Council of the Family and Reproductive Health Section of the American Public Health Association.  Additionally, she is co-editor, with Merrill Singer of the book series Advances in Critical Medical Anthropology with Routledge.

Selected publications

Books

Articles

References

External links
 https://web.archive.org/web/20130921231500/http://www.chip.uconn.edu/chipweb/bio.php?id=40
 https://web.archive.org/web/20100625193330/http://www.cehdl.uconn.edu/affiliates/perickson.html

1951 births
Living people
Medical anthropologists
UCLA School of Public Health alumni
University at Buffalo alumni